San Pedro Island is applied to several islands throughout the world, usually by Spanish explorers in honor of Saint Peter.

 Isla San Pedro, a private island off the southeastern shore of Chiloé Island, Chile
 San Pedro Nolasco Island, in the Gulf of California
 South Georgia Island, called San Pedro Island by the Argentine government
 Hinunangan, Southern Leyte, Philippines

See also 
 San Pedro, a fictional island mentioned in Madonna's 1986 song "La Isla Bonita"
 San Pedro (disambiguation)